The following is a list of Sites of Special Scientific Interest in the East Ross and Cromarty, Scotland,  Area of Search. For other areas, see List of SSSIs by Area of Search.

 Achanalt Marshes
 Achnasheen Terraces
 Allt nan Caorach
 Alness River Valley
 Beauly Firth
 Beinn Dearg
 Ben Wyvis
 Black Park Edderton
 Black Rock Gorge
 Braelangwell Wood
 Calrossie
 Càrn Gorm
 Craigroy Burn
 Cromarty Firth
 Dam Wood
 Dornoch Firth
 Drummondreach Wood
 Easter Fearn
 Fannich Hills
 Kinrive-Strathrory
 Loch Achnacloich
 Loch Eye
 Loch Ussie
 Lower River Conon
 Monadh Mòr
 Monar Forest
 Morrich More
 Munlochy Bay
 Pitmaduthy Moss
 Rosemarkie to Shandwick Coast
 Roskill
 Struie Channels
 Talich
 Tarbat Ness
 The Dens

 
East Ross and Cromarty